Jasdeep Singh (born February 10, 1993) is an American cricketer who made his debut for the U.S. national side in May 2015. He is a right-arm medium-pace bowler who bats right-handed.

Personal life
Singh was born in Queens, New York, to Punjabi parents. He and his family moved back to India when he was three years old, but when he was 13 they returned to the United States and settled in New Jersey.

Domestic and franchise career
Singh took a hat-trick for a Cricket League of New Jersey representative side against Minnesota in 2012. He has also played for clubs in New York City. At the 2014 National Championships in Florida, which was played between eight regional sides, he played for the Central West Region team, which primarily draws its players from leagues in Texas.

Singh made his first-class debut for Kalutara Physical Culture Club in Sri Lanka's Premier League Tournament Tier B on 21 December 2016, against Sri Lanka Ports Authority Cricket Club. He made his List A debut for ICC Americas in the 2016–17 Regional Super50 on 26 January 2017. In October 2018, he was named in the United States' squad for the 2018–19 Regional Super50 tournament in the West Indies.

In June 2019, he was selected to play for the Toronto Nationals franchise team in the 2019 Global T20 Canada tournament. However, in July 2019, Singh withdrew from the Global T20 Canada tournament, after signing a 12-month central contract with USA Cricket.

In July 2020, he was named in the Guyana Amazon Warriors squad for the 2020 Caribbean Premier League. In June 2021, he was selected to take part in the Minor League Cricket tournament in the United States following the players' draft.

International career
Singh was called into the national squad in April 2015, for the 2015 Americas Twenty20 Championship the following month. He was one of only four American-born players in the team, the others being Akeem Dodson, Hammad Shahid, and Steven Taylor. However, at the tournament he featured in only one match, taking 0/15 opening the bowling with Muhammad Ghous. Singh was retained in the U.S. squad for the 2015 World Twenty20 Qualifier in Ireland and Scotland, and went on to make his Twenty20 debut in the opening match of the tournament against Nepal.

In February 2019, he was named in the United States' Twenty20 International (T20I) squad for their series against the United Arab Emirates. The matches were the first T20I fixtures to be played by the United States cricket team. He made his T20I debut for the United States against the United Arab Emirates on 15 March 2019.

In April 2019, he was named in the United States cricket team's squad for the 2019 ICC World Cricket League Division Two tournament in Namibia. The United States finished in the top four places in the tournament, therefore gaining One Day International (ODI) status. Singh made his ODI debut for the United States on 27 April 2019, against Papua New Guinea, in the tournament's third-place playoff.

In June 2019, he was named in a 30-man training squad for the United States cricket team, ahead of the Regional Finals of the 2018–19 ICC T20 World Cup Americas Qualifier tournament in Bermuda. In August 2019, he was named in the final squad for the tournament. In November 2019, he was named in the United States' squad for the 2019–20 Regional Super50 tournament.

References

External links

1993 births
Living people
American cricketers
American sportspeople of Indian descent
American people of Punjabi descent
People from Queens, New York
American Sikhs
Cricketers from New York City
Kalutara Physical Culture Centre cricketers
ICC Americas cricketers
United States One Day International cricketers
United States Twenty20 International cricketers